Ranitomeya sirensis is a species of poison dart frog found in the Amazonian rainforests of northern Bolivia (Pando Department), westernmost Brazil (Acre), and eastern Peru.

R. sirensis is known as the Sira poison frog. R. sirensis is kept as a pet by herpetoculturists and is considered to be one of the more difficult poison dart frogs to keep due to its relative rarity and the delicate nature of its tadpoles.

Poison 
Like most Ranitomeya species, R. sirensis is a mildly toxic poison dart frog. Its skin secretes small amounts of pumiliotoxins which coat the frog and cause pain and mild muscle spasms if the frog is handled carelessly. The symptoms may be more severe if the frog is ingested, but unlike the Phyllobates and Oophaga species, R. sirensis secretes the comparatively mild pumiliotoxin C in very small quantities due to its tiny size. As a result, sirensis mostly rely on their agility, speed, and ability to take shelter in the leaf litter or in dense foliage for protection.

R. sirensis, as with all dendrobatid frogs, loses its poison in captivity. The reason for the loss of its toxicity is thought to be the removal of a toxic insect or other invertebrate from the diet. Scientists have determined that members of the genus Phyllobates derive their dangerously potent toxins from local melyrid beetles. As R. sirensis is much less toxic than the Phyllobates species, the source of its toxin is not thought to be melyrid beetles; instead, it is likely an invertebrate that remains undiscovered.

Habitat and conservation
R. sirensis inhabits premontane, montane and lowland moist secondary tropical forests. It tolerates some degree of habitat modification. It is collected for illegal pet trade, which is a threat particularly to isolated subpopulations with extreme colour morphs.

References

Ranitomeya
Amphibians described in 1991
Amphibians of Bolivia
Amphibians of Brazil
Amphibians of Peru